River Crest Sanitarium was a New York State licensed mental hospital located in Astoria, Queens. River Crest was founded in 1896 by John J. Kindred (1864-1937), a Virginia native who moved to Queens and was elected to the House of Representatives, serving from 1911 to 1913 and 1921 to 1929.

History
The institution went out of business in 1961. "A high school now occupies the rear of the site," and a local restaurant is "named after the Sanitarium."

Notable patients
 Edward Gallagher – Actor, 1927
 Wilhelm Steinitz – World Chess Champion, 1900
 Thomas J. Callan – 1900

References

Astoria, Queens
Defunct hospitals in Queens
Demolished buildings and structures in New York (state)